Rebane is an Estonian surname meaning "fox". Notable people with the surname include:

Alfons Rebane (1908–1976), Estonian military commander
Bill Rebane (born 1937), Latvian-born American film director, producer, screenwriter, and author
Hans Rebane (1882–1961), Estonian politician, diplomat, former Minister of Foreign Affairs
Helju Rebane (born 1948), Estonian writer
Karl Rebane (1926–2007), Estonian physicist
Ljubov Rebane (1929–1991), Estonian physicist
Peeter Rebane (born 1973), Estonian film producer and director and entrepreneur
Raul Rebane (born 1953), Estonian journalist and communication consultant

Estonian-language surnames
Surnames from nicknames